was a town located in Saru District, Hidaka Subprefecture, Hokkaido, Japan.

On March 1, 2006, Monbetsu was merged into the expanded town of Hidaka.

As of 2004, the town had an estimated population of 12,836 and a density of 29.94 persons per km2. The total area was 428.73 km2.

Climate

References

External links
Hidaka official website 

Dissolved municipalities of Hokkaido